Jestřabí v Krkonoších is a municipality and village in Semily District in the Liberec Region of the Czech Republic. It has about 200 inhabitants.

Administrative parts
Villages of Křížlice and Roudnice are administrative parts of Jestřabí v Krkonoších.

References

Villages in Semily District